Sena is an unincorporated community and census-designated place in San Miguel County, New Mexico, United States.  It is located along the Pecos River and New Mexico State Highway 3.

Demographics

History
Sena was founded in the 19th century.

Economy

Sena has no commercial enterprises of its own.

Education
It is in the West Las Vegas Schools school district. West Las Vegas High School is the area high school.

See also
 San Miguel del Vado Land Grant

References

External links
 Sena community profile
 Geology of Sena area
 Map of communities in San Miguel County

Census-designated places in New Mexico
Census-designated places in San Miguel County, New Mexico
Unincorporated communities in New Mexico
Unincorporated communities in San Miguel County, New Mexico